Razi University (Daneshgah-e Razi) is a public university based in Kermanshah, Iran. The school's Science and Engineering Departments attract many Iranian high school graduates as well as many graduate school applicants from all over Iran with a majority admitted from western provinces.

The university has almost 13,000 students, enrolled in several bachelor's (B.A., B.S.), master's (M.A., M.S.), and Ph.D. programs.

Name 
The university is named after Muhammad ibn Zakariya al-Razi (also known by his Latinized name Rhazes), one of the most outstanding Iranian scholars of the third century. He was considered one of the finest clinical physicians and thinkers of Islam and the Middle Ages and a man with good morals who often helped those in need.

History 
The University's first faculty, the Faculty of Science, was first founded in 1972 by Dr. Abdolali Gouya. At the beginning of 1972-73 academic year and with 200 students in physics, chemistry, biology, and math, the university and the faculty formally began working.

With the establishment of the Faculty of Medicine in Kermanshah, Faculty of Teacher Training in Sanandaj, and the Faculty of Veterinary Medicine in Ilam, Razi University expanded; after the Islamic Revolution, the aforementioned faculties separated into Kermanshah University of Medical Sciences, University of Kurdistan, and University of Ilam, respectively.

Faculties 
Razi University currently comprises 12 faculties and campuses:

Faculty of Literature and Humanities 
Faculty of Literature and Humanities was established in 1988 on the current location of the Faculty of Social Sciences, with only Persian Language and Literature as program. With expansion of the faculty and introduction of new schools, and independence of the Faculty of Social Sciences in 2007, the faculty moved to its current location on Taq-e Bostan campus. The faculty includes seven departments:

 Department of Theology
 Department of Persian Language and Literature
 Department of Arabic Language and Literature
 Department of English Language and Literature
 Department of Geography
 Department of Islamic Studies
 Department of Law, History and Archaeology

Faculty of Chemistry 
The Faculty of Chemistry was founded as Department of Chemistry in 1974 on the Faculty of Science campus. The faculty has seven departments:

 Department of Organic Chemistry
 Department of Applied Chemistry
 Department of Analytical Chemistry
 Department of Inorganic Chemistry
 Department of Physical Chemistry
 Department of Nano Science and Technology

Faculty of Physical Education and Sport Science

Faculty of Science 
This faculty was founded as the first faculty of the Razi University in 1972.

 Department of Statistics
 Department of Mathematics
 Department of Biology
 Department of Physics

Faculty of Social Sciences 
It was separated from Literature and Humanities in 2007 and is currently located on 3 hectares (7.4 acres) campus in Beheshti Boulevard, and includes eight departments:

 Department of Political Science
 Department of Economy
 Department of Social Science
 Department of Consulting
 Department of Information and Knowledge Science
 Department of Psychology
 Department of Entrepreneurship and Management
 Department of Accounting

Faculty of Engineering 
The construction of the Faculty of Engineering started in 1989 was commissioned in 1992. It includes:

 School of Chemical Engineering
 School of Computer Engineering
 Department of Electrical Engineering
 Department of Architectural Engineering
 Department of Mechanical Engineering
 Department of Materials and Textile Engineering

Faculty of Advanced Technology and Science 

 Department of Advanced Computer Systems Engineering
 Department of Nanobiotechnology
 Department of Interdisciplinary Science

Campus of Agriculture and Natural Resources 
The Campus of Agriculture and Natural Resources is among the oldest parts of Razi University, which started its activities as an agricultural school in 1981. Following the expansion of departments and majors, it was promoted to a faculty, and in 2011 it became a campus with three schools:

 School of Science and Agricultural Engineering
 Department of Water Engineering
 Department of Animal Science
 Department of Agronomy and Plant Genetics
 School of Agriculture
 Department of Biosystems Mechanical Engineering
 Department of Phytopathology
 Department of Soil Science and Engineering
 Department of Natural Resources
 Department of Training and Promotion of Agriculture
 School of Veterinary Medicine
 Department of Clinical Science
 Department of Basic Science and Pathobiology

Javanrud Campus of Management 

 Department of Business Administration
 Department of Financial Management
 Department of Accountig

Sonqor Campus of Agriculture 

 Department of Biosystems Mechanics Engineering
 Department of Agricultural Mechanization Engineering
 Department of Food Industry Machinery Engineering

Eslamabad Campus of Engineering 

 Department of Industrial Engineering
 Department of Computer Engineering
 Department of Architectural Engineering

Research and Educational Centers 
At present, Razi University comprises following centers:

 Razi Center for Architectural and Urban Planning Studies (RCAUPS)
 Center for Urban Studies (CUS)
 APA Center for Cybersecurity Incidents 
 Razi University Language Center (RULC)
 Razi University Language Proficiency Test (RULPT)
 Enterprise Architecture Lab (EAL)
 Cloud Computing Research Center (CCRC)
 Center for Environmental Studies (CES)
 Razi Institute for Telecom Research (RITR)

International Journals 
 Advanced Technologies in Water Efficiency
 Advances in Nanochemistry
 Aging Psychology
 Agrotechniques in Industrial Crops
 Biodiversity and Animal Taxonomy
 Cereal Biotechnology and Biochemistry
 Geography and Sustainability of Environment
 International Political Economy Studies
 Journal of Applied Research in Water and Wastewater
 Journal of Catalyst and Reaction Engineering
 Journal of Workbook of Literary Texts in the Iraqi Period
 Mesopotamian Political Studies
 Public Sector Economics
 Research in Comparative Literature
 Research on Fictional Literature
 Western Iranian Languages and Dialects

See also

 List of Iranian Research Centers
 Higher education in Iran
 Academy of Gundishapur
 Nizamiyyah
 Darolfonoon
 List of Iranian scientists from the pre-modern era.
 Modern Iranian scientists and engineers
 Education in Iran
 National Library of Iran

References

External links
Official website

Universities in Iran
Educational institutions established in 1972
Education in Kermanshah Province
Buildings and structures in Kermanshah